Kjell Øvergård (born 28 July 1947) is a Norwegian politician for the Labour Party.

He served as a deputy representative to the Norwegian Parliament from Akershus during the term 1997–2001.

On the local level Øvergård was the mayor of Enebakk from 1992 to 1993.

References

1947 births
Living people
Deputy members of the Storting
Labour Party (Norway) politicians
Mayors of places in Akershus
Place of birth missing (living people)
20th-century Norwegian politicians
People from Enebakk